Zeuzeropecten occultoides is a moth of the  family Cossidae. It is found in Madagascar.

This is a large heavy moth with a wingspan of 80 mm for the males and 90 mm for the females.

References

Zeuzerinae
Moths described in 1914
Moths of Madagascar
Moths of Africa